The 1960 United States presidential election in Illinois took place on November 8, 1960, as part of the 1960 United States presidential election. State voters chose 27 representatives, or electors, to the Electoral College, who voted for president and vice president.

In the nation's second-closest race following Hawaii, Illinois was won by Senator John F. Kennedy (D–Massachusetts), running with Senator Lyndon B. Johnson, with 49.98% of the popular vote against incumbent Vice President Richard Nixon (R–California), running with United States Ambassador to the United Nations Henry Cabot Lodge, Jr., with 49.80% of the popular vote, a margin of victory of only 0.18%. As of 2020 this is the last time that a Democrat would win Illinois by only a single digit margin of victory.

Election information
The primaries and general elections coincided with those for other federal offices (Senate and House), as well as those for state offices.

Turnout
Turnout in the state-run primary elections (Democratic and Republican) was 16.43% with a total of 836,458 votes cast.

Turnout during the general election was 86.51%, with 4,757,409 votes cast.

Primaries
Both major parties held non-binding state-run preferential primaries on April 12.

Democratic

The 1960 Illinois Democratic presidential primary was held on April 12, 1960 in the U.S. state of Illinois as one of the Democratic Party's state primaries ahead of the 1960 presidential election.

The popular vote was a non-binding "beauty contest". Delegates were instead elected by direct votes by congressional district on delegate candidates.

All candidates were write-ins. Kennedy ran a write-in campaign, and no candidate actively ran against him in Illinois.

Not all of the vote-getters had been declared candidates. Johnson, Stevenson, and Symington had all sat out the primaries.

Chicago mayor Richard J. Daley, head of the Cook County Democratic Party, promised to deliver Kennedy the support of Cook County's delegates, so long as Kennedy won competitive primaries in other states.

Republican

The 1960 Illinois Republican presidential primary was held on April 12, 1960 in the U.S. state of Illinois as one of the Republican Party's state primaries ahead of the 1960 presidential election.

The preference vote was a "beauty contest". Delegates were instead selected by direct-vote in each congressional districts on delegate candidates.

Nixon ran unopposed in the primary.

Controversy
Some, including Republican legislators and journalists, believed that Kennedy benefited from vote fraud from Mayor Richard J. Daley's powerful Chicago political machine. 

Daley's machine was known for "delivering whopping Democratic tallies by fair means and foul." 
Republicans tried and failed to overturn the results at the time—as well as in ten other states. 
Some journalists also later claimed that mobster Sam Giancana and his Chicago crime syndicate "played a role" in Kennedy's victory. Nixon's campaign staff urged him to pursue recounts and challenge the validity of Kennedy's victory, but Nixon gave a speech three days after the election that he would not contest the election.

A myth arose that Daley held back much of the Chicago vote until the late morning hours of November 9. However, when the Republican Chicago Tribune went to press, 79% of Cook County precincts had reported, compared to just 62% of Illinois's precincts overall. Moreover, Nixon never led in Illinois, and Kennedy's lead merely shrank as election night went on. Earl Mazo, a reporter for the pro-Nixon New York Herald Tribune and his biographer, investigated the voting in Chicago and "claimed to have discovered sufficient evidence of vote fraud to prove that the state was stolen for Kennedy."

A special prosecutor assigned to the case brought charges against 650 people, who were acquitted by a judge who was considered a "Daley machine loyalist." 
Three Chicago election workers were convicted of voter fraud in 1962 and served short terms in jail. Mazo, the Herald-Tribune reporter, later said that he "found names of the dead who had voted in Chicago, along with 56 people from one house." He found cases of Republican voter fraud in southern Illinois but said that the totals "did not match the Chicago fraud he found."

An academic study in 1985 later analyzed the ballots of two disputed precincts in Chicago which were subject to a recount.  It found that while there was a pattern of miscounting votes to the advantage of Democratic candidates, Nixon suffered less than Republicans in other races, and the extrapolated error would have reduced his Illinois margin only from 8,858 votes, the final official total, to just under 8,000. It concluded there was insufficient evidence that he had been cheated out of winning Illinois.

Even if enough legitimate systemic fraud was discovered in Illinois to give Nixon the state, that alone would not have been enough to win him the presidency. Kennedy would've still been left with 276 electoral votes, seven more than what he needed to win the White House.

Results

Results by county

See also
 United States presidential elections in Illinois

References

Illinois
1960
1960 Illinois elections
Electoral fraud in the United States